The term Hilbert geometry may refer to several things named after David Hilbert:

 Hilbert's axioms, a modern axiomatization of Euclidean geometry
 Hilbert space, a space in many ways resembling a Euclidean space, but in important instances infinite-dimensional
 Hilbert metric, a metric that makes a bounded convex subset of a Euclidean space into an unbounded metric space